John Luther Zimmerman IV (born November 26, 1973) is an American professional pair skater and coach. With skating partner Kyoko Ina, he is the 2002 World bronze medalist and a three-time U.S. national champion. They also competed at the 2002 Olympics. Zimmerman was suspended by the United States Center for SafeSport in March 2021 for a two-year period.

Personal life
Zimmerman was born in Birmingham, Alabama. He has two older sisters. He married Italian-American skater Silvia Fontana on August 28, 2003. They have two daughters, one born on April 2, 2012 at Northwest Medical Center in Coconut Creek, Florida, and another born on June 2, 2013.

Career
Zimmerman started skating at age 3 at a mall. He briefly partnered with Brie Teaboldt for the 1994-95 season. Then he paired with Stephanie Stiegler from 1995 through 1998, and won the bronze medal at the 1997 U.S. Figure Skating Championships while being coached by Peter Oppegard. Their partnership ended in 1998 due to injuries.

Zimmerman teamed up with Kyoko Ina in 1998. Initially, they were coached by Peter Burrows and Mary Lynn Gelderman in Monsey, New York, and they also commuted to Stamford, Connecticut, to work with Tamara Moskvina. They later trained under Moskvina and Igor Moskvin in Hackensack, New Jersey.

Ina and Zimmerman won the bronze medal at the 2002 World Championships. In 2003, they turned professional and began skating on Stars on Ice.

Zimmerman competed in the January 2006 FOX television program "Skating with Celebrities", where he partnered with FOX broadcaster Jillian Barberie. They finished in second place.

Zimmerman was featured as Yahoo's special guest expert correspondent for figure skating at the 2006 Winter Olympics in Turin. He later competed in an ABC skating series "Thin Ice" (aired on March 19, 2010), paired with world champion Canadian ice dancer Shae-Lynn Bourne. They finished in second place, winning a total of $50,000. They skated to "Closer" by Ne-Yo and "Poker Face" by Lady Gaga.

Zimmerman worked as a coach at Panthers Ice Den in Coral Springs, Florida, with Silvia Fontana. They now coach at Florida Hospital Center Ice in Wesley Chapel, Florida. He has coached Haven Denney / Brandon Frazier (from Autumn 2012 to February 2015 and since 2018 again) and Vanessa James / Morgan Cipres (from June 2016).

Suspension
In December 2019, Zimmerman, Fontana, and fellow coach Vinny Dispenza, were accused in a United States Center for SafeSport investigation of covering up alleged sexual abuse committed by Ciprès via intimidation tactics. Zimmerman was suspended for two years and received one additional year of probation by SafeSport in March 2021 for abuse of process, emotional misconduct, and failure to report sexual abuse of a 13 year old he was coaching. He was barred from any skating events run by U.S. Figure Skating or the Olympic committee, and prohibited from attending any facility run by those groups.

Programs 
(with Ina)

Results
GP: Champions Series / Grand Prix

With Kyoko Ina

With Stephanie Stiegler

With Brie Teaboldt

References

External links

 Official Ina/Zimmerman site
 Official John Zimmerman site
 

1973 births
20th-century American people
21st-century American people
American male pair skaters
Figure skaters at the 2002 Winter Olympics
American figure skating coaches
Living people
Olympic figure skaters of the United States
Sportspeople from Birmingham, Alabama
World Figure Skating Championships medalists
Four Continents Figure Skating Championships medalists
Child sexual abuse in the United States
Sports controversies